Asuroides is a genus of moths in the family Erebidae. The genus was erected by Antonio Durante in 2008.

Species
 Asuroides atricraspeda
 Asuroides calimerae
 Asuroides dimidiata
 Asuroides fasciata
 Asuroides retromaculata
 Asuroides rosea
 Asuroides rubea
 Asuroides sagenaria
 Asuroides similis

References

Durante, Antonio (2008). "Asuroides, a new genus of lithosiine moths (Lepidoptera, Arctiidae, Lithosiinae)". Zootaxa. 1713: 53-68.

Nudariina
Moth genera